The Proceedings of the Institution of Mechanical Engineers, Part C: Journal of Mechanical Engineering Science is a peer-reviewed scientific journal that covers the fundamentals of engineering science and its application to the solution of challenges and problems in engineering. The journal obtained its current name in 1989 when it was split off from the Proceedings of the Institution of Mechanical Engineers. It is published by SAGE Publications on behalf of the Institution of Mechanical Engineers. The editor-in-chief is J.W. Chew (University of Surrey).

Abstracting and indexing 
The 'journal is abstracted and indexed in Scopus and the Science Citation Index Expanded. According to the Journal Citation Reports, its 2020 impact factor is 1.762.

References

External links 
 

Engineering journals
English-language journals
Institution of Mechanical Engineers academic journals
Publications established in 1989
SAGE Publishing academic journals